Maurice Escande (14 November 1892 – 10 February 1973) was a French stage and film actor. In 1948 he starred in the film The Lame Devil under Sacha Guitry.

Selected filmography

1917: Un vol étrange (Short)
1918: Simone - Michel Mignier
1920: L'essor - Max de Chéroy
1921: Mademoiselle de La Seiglière - Raoul de Vaubert
1921: Fromont jeune et Risler aîné - Fromont jeune
1921: Les trois lys (Short)
1922: La ferme du choquart - Le marquis de Montaillé
1922: Molière, sa vie, son oeuvre
1923: Les deux soldats - Julien Farjol
1924: Un gentleman neurasthénique
1925: Nantas - Desfondettes
1925: La damnation de Faust
1931: Luck
1932: Kiss Me - Gaston
1932: Chassé-croisé
1932: The Three Musketeers - Buckingham
1932: Totoche et compagnie
1933: Le gendre de Monsieur Poirier - Hector de Montmeyran
1933: Son altesse impériale - Le comte Symoff
1933: Jeunes filles à marier - John Gordon
1935: Les époux scandaleux - Desbonnières
1935: Dora Nelson - Santini
1935: Lucrezia Borgia - Jean Borgia, Duke of Gandie
1935: The Green Domino (Le domino vert) - Henri Bruquier - un critique d'art
1935: Un soir à la Comédie Française (Documentary)
1936: Le collier du grand duc - L'inspecteur
1936: La Garçonne (La garçonne) - Lucien Vigneret
1936: Les deux gamines - Pierre Manin
1936: Sept hommes, une femme - Bizulier
1936: The Two Boys - Georges de Kerlor
1936: Tout va très bien madame la marquise - Le marquis des Esnards
1936: Les demi vierges - Julien de Suberceaux
1936: Les petites alliées - Le duc de Lestissac
1937: The Red Dancer - Ursac
1937: Cinderella - Gilbert
1937: The Messenger - Géo
1938: La Marseillaise - Le seigneur du village
1938: Liberté - Auguste Bartholdi
1938: Café de Paris - Le marquis de Perelli
1939: La belle revanche - Jacques Dorcel
1940: Paris-New York - Conrad
1940: Moulin Rouge - Colorado
1941: The Black Diamond - Guy de Fresnoy
1941: Madame Sans-Gêne - Le comte de Neipperg
1942: La femme que j'ai le plus aimée - Gaëtan
1942: Étoiles de demain (Short, Documentary)
1942: Patricia - André Vernon
1943: Captain Fracasse - Le marquis des Bruyères / Il marchese di Bruyeres
1944: La vie de plaisir - Le comte Roger de Boëldieu - un mondain, le fiancé d'Hélène
1945: Farandole - Le procureur
1945: Father Goriot - Monsieur de Restaud
1945: Échec au roy - Le roi Louis XIV
1945: Bifur 3 - Alvarez
1946: The Captain - Le prince de Condé
1946: The Queen's Necklace - Le cardinal de Rohan
1947: Hymenée - L'industriel Pierre Vairon
1948: La renégate - Le caïd Tahmar
1948: Man to Men - Jérôme de Lormel
1948: The Lame Devil (Le diable boîteux) - Randall
1949: Monseigneur - Le duc de Saint Germain
1950: Amour et compagnie - M. Lecourtois
1951: L'Étrange Madame X - Jacques Voisin-Larive
1951: Coq en pâte - Me Jacques Lion
1952: Buridan, héros de la tour de Nesle - Enguerrand de Marigny
1952: Jouons le jeu - l'acteur (segment 'L'optimisme')
1953: Des quintuplés au pensionnat - Le comte
1953: The Lady of the Camellias - Le duc
1955: Caroline and the Rebels - (uncredited)
1955: Napoléon - Louis XV (uncredited)
1956: If Paris Were Told to Us (Si Paris nous était conté)
1955: Le fils de Caroline Chérie - Le Baron de Grimm
1960: Antigone (TV Movie)
1963: Les animaux
1964: Comment épouser un premier ministre - Grandbourg
1966: Martin Soldat (Martin soldat) - Le président du jury pour la Comédie-Française
1971: Le cinéma de papa - Le metteur en scène académicien (final film role)

External links

  Les gens du cinéma
 

French male film actors
1892 births
1973 deaths
French male stage actors
French male silent film actors
Male actors from Paris
Administrators of the Comédie-Française
Sociétaires of the Comédie-Française
20th-century French male actors
French National Academy of Dramatic Arts alumni